List of tourist attractions in Somogy County is a collection of main sights in Somogy County, Hungary.

Built environment

Buildings

 Kaposvár - historic city centre mostly built in Ecletic style and Secession. (e.g. Arany Oroszlán Gyógyszertár, Gergely Csiky Theatre, Dorottya Theatre, Dorottya Mall (today a hotel), County Hall, City Hall, Szivárvány Culture Palace etc.)
 Siófok - port with steam boats from the 19th century
 Szólád - loess cellars
 Kaposmérő - Kassay Valley, ancient Hungarian yurts, Lajos Kassai'''s archery school and exhibition
 Somogyvámos - Krishna Valley Patca - Katica Farm Bonnya - Garten of Somogy holiday village
 Hajmás - Zselicvölgy amusement park
 Nagyatád - open air sculpture park
 Balatonlelle - Rádpuszta gastronomic experience estate, equestrian centre in the Festetics Mansioncím=A Festetich-majorság Rádpusztán (muemlekem.hu)
 Zamárdi - amusement park

Churches, Chapels, Church ruins

 Kaposvár - Nagyboldogasszony Cathedral - leading church of the Roman Catholic Diocese of Kaposvár
 Kaposvár - Benedictine Abbey of Kaposszentjakab (formerly Abbey of Zselicszentjakab) - medieval ecclesiastical ruins
 Somogyvár - Benedictine Abbey of Saint Giles - medieval ecclesiastical ruins
 Somogyvámos - Pusztatemplom - medieval church ruins
 Gyugy - medieval church ruins
 Siófok - Lutheran Church (built by Imre Makovecz
 Kőröshegy - medieval, gothic church
 Somogyacsa - Chapel of Gerézdpuszta Lengyeltóti - partly medieval church
 Somogyszil - baroque church with original gothic elements
 Libickozma - Baptist church
 Lábod - medieval cemetery chapel
 Szenna - Reformed church with wooden cassette
 Szenyér - medieval church
 Őrtilos - Church of Szent Mihály Mountain Gadány - medieval church
 Kisgyalán - round church built in 1781
 Ádánd - medieval church
 Somogybükkösd - medieval church
 Segesd - Franciscan monastery and church from the 18th century
 Teleki - medieval chapel
 Rádpuszta, Balatonlelle - medieval church ruins
 Somodor - medieval church ruins
 Somogyszentpál - medieval church ruins
 Vörs - world's biggest Bethlehem (Nativity of Jesus)
 Csurgó - Holy Spirit Church - medieval church
 Andocs - Church of Assumption, one of the most famous Hungarian pilgrimage sites

Calvaries
 Kaposvár
 Kaposvár
 Balatonföldvár
 Somogyacsa
 Gölle
 Gyugy
 Lengyeltóti
 Somogyvár
 Lad - built in 1855
 Barcs
 Igal
 Andocs
 Marcali
 Csoma

Nature habitat

Museums, Exhibitions, Galleries
 Kaposvár - Vaszary House Kaposvár - County Museum
 Kaposvár - Rippl-Rónai Villa Kaposvár - Steiner Gallery Nikla - Berzsenyi Mension with its museum
 Barcs - Drava Museum Somogyfajsz - old smelter
 Siófok - Crytall Museum
 Siófok - House of Emmerich Kálmán
 Vörs - Firefighter Museum
 Tab - Ferenc Nagy Gallery Andocs - Museum of Mary clothes brought by pilgrims for the Statue of Mary
 Somogytúr - House of Lajos Kunffy Zala - Mihály Zichy Museum Bábonymegyer - House of Gyula Rudnay Segesd - local museum in the old mill
 Nagyatád - town museum
 Marcali - town museum
 Gölle - birthplace of István Fekete
 Balatonboglár - local museum in the Fischl House Újvárfalva - Noszlopy Mansion, birthplace of Gáspár Noszlopy Nagybajom - local museum
 Balatonendréd - Lace Museum
 Balatonszemes - Post Museum
 Balatonszemes - House of Zoltán Latinovits''
 Zselickisfalud - planetary, observatory
 Péterhida - water mill

See also
 Tourism in Hungary
 Somogy County

References

Tourism in Hungary
Tourist attractions in Hungary
Somogy